The 2015 International League season began on April 9 and culminated on September 7, 2015. Following the regular season, the Governors' Cup playoffs were played from September 9–19, 2015.

The 2015 Triple-A All-Star Game was held on Wednesday, July 15 at Werner Park in Papillion, Nebraska, home of the Omaha Storm Chasers. The International League All-Stars defeated the Pacific Coast League All-Stars, 4–3, for their eleventh win in the series.

The Columbus Clippers defeated the Indianapolis Indians, 3 games to 2, to win their tenth Governors' Cup. 

The Cippers, however, were defeated by the PCL champion Fresno Grizzlies, 7–0, in the 2015 Triple-A Baseball National Championship Game at Southwest University Park in El Paso, Texas.

Teams

Standings

North Division

South Division

West Division

Playoffs

Bracket

Semifinals

Scranton/Wilkes-Barre vs. Indianapolis

Norfolk Tides vs. Columbus Clippers

Governors' Cup Finals

Columbus vs. Indianapolis

Attendance

References

External links
International League official website 

International League seasons